The H-1B is a visa in the United States under the Immigration and Nationality Act, section 101(a)(15)(H) that allows U.S. employers to employ foreign workers in specialty occupations. A specialty occupation requires the application of specialized knowledge and a bachelor's degree or the equivalent of work experience. The duration of stay is three years, extendable to six years, after which the visa holder may need to reapply. Laws limit the number of H-1B visas that are issued each year: 188,100 new and initial H-1B visas were issued in 2019. Employers must generally withhold Social Security and Medicare taxes from the wages paid to employees in H-1B status.

The H-1B visa has its roots in the H1 visa of the Immigration and Nationality Act of 1952; the split between H-1A (for nurses) and H-1B was created by the Immigration Act of 1990. 65,000 H-1B visas were made available each fiscal year, out of which employers could apply through Labor Condition Applications. Additional modifications to H-1B rules were made by legislation in 1998, 2000, in 2003 for Singapore and Chile, in the H-1B Visa Reform Act of 2004, 2008, and 2009. United States Citizenship and Immigration Services has modified the rules in the years since then.

Structure of the program
An H-1B visa allows an individual to enter the United States to temporarily work at an employer in a specialty occupation. The regulations define a specialty occupation as requiring theoretical and practical application of a body of highly specialized knowledge in a field of human endeavor including but not limited to biotechnology, chemistry, computing, architecture, engineering, statistics, physical sciences, journalism, medicine and health: doctor, dentists, nurses, physiotherapists, etc., economics, education, research, law, accounting, business specialties, technical writing, theology, and the arts, and requiring the attainment of a bachelor's degree or its equivalent as a minimum (with the exception of fashion models, who must be "of distinguished merit and ability"). Likewise, the foreign worker must possess at least a bachelor's degree or its equivalent and state licensure, if required to practice in that field. H-1B work-authorization is strictly limited to employment by the sponsoring employer.

A person in H-1B status must continue to be employed by their employer in order to stay in H-1B status. If the person's employment ends for any reason, the person must leave the United States, unless the person applies for and is granted a change of status or finds another employer compatible with the H-1B status. Effective January 17, 2017, the United States Citizenship and Immigration Services allows grace period of up to 60 days to stay in the United States after the person's end of employment.

Duration of stay
The duration of stay is three years, extendable to six years. An exception to maximum length of stay applies in certain circumstances:
 If a visa holder has submitted an I-140 immigrant petition or a labor certification prior to their fifth anniversary of having the H-1B visa, they are entitled to renew their H-1B visa in one-year increments until a decision has been rendered on their application for permanent residence.  This is backed up by the Immigration and Nationality Act 106(a).
 If the visa holder has an approved I-140 immigrant petition, but is unable to initiate the final step of the green card process due to their priority date not being current, they may be entitled to a three-year extension of their H-1B visa until their adjustment of status can finish. This exception originated with the American Competitiveness in the 21st Century Act of 2000 section 104a (AC21 104a).
 The maximum duration of the H-1B visa is ten years for exceptional United States Department of Defense project related work.

A time increment of less than three years has sometimes applied to citizens of specific countries.  For example, during Melania Trump's time as a H-1B visa holder, she was limited to one year increments, which was the maximum time allowed then per H-1B visa for citizens of Slovenia. Melania Trump became a citizen in 2006.

H-1B holders who want to continue to work in the U.S. after six years, but who have not obtained permanent residency status, must remain outside of the U.S. for one year before reapplying for another H-1B visa if they do not qualify for one of the exceptions noted above allowing for extensions beyond six years. Despite a limit on length of stay, no requirement exists that the individual remain for any period in the job the visa was originally issued for. This is known as H-1B portability or transfer, provided the new employer sponsors another H-1B visa, which may or may not be subjected to the quota.

Congressional yearly numerical cap and exemptions
The Immigration Act of 1990 established a limit of 65,000 foreign nationals who may be issued a visa or otherwise provided H-1B status each fiscal year; the annual limit is often called a quota or a cap. An additional 20,000 H-1Bs are available to foreign nationals holding a master's or higher degree from U.S. universities. In addition, excluded from the ceiling are all H-1B non-immigrants who work at (but not necessarily for) universities, non-profit research facilities associated with universities, and government research facilities.

Institutions of higher education, nonprofit organizations that are related or affiliated to institutions of higher education, nonprofit research organizations, and governmental-research organizations are exempt from H-1B annual quotas. Contractors working at, but not directly employed by, these institutions may be exempt from the annual quotas as well. However, employers must show that, first, the majority of the worker's duties will be performed at the qualifying institution, organization or entity and, second, the job duties directly and predominantly further the essential purpose, mission objectives or functions of the qualifying institution, organization, or entity.

The Chile–United States Free Trade Agreement and the Singapore–United States Free Trade Agreement created a separate quota of 1,400 H-1B1 visas for Chilean nationals and 5,400 H-1B1 visas for Singapore nationals. If these reserved visas are not used, however, then they added to the following fiscal year's H-1B annual quota.

Due to these exemptions and rollovers, the number of H-1B visas issued each year is often greater than 65,000, such as when 117,828 H-1B visas were issued in fiscal year 2010, 129,552 in fiscal year 2011, and 135,991 in fiscal year 2012.

In some years, the cap was not reached. For example, in fiscal year 1996, the Immigration and Naturalization Service (now known as USCIS) announced on August 20, 1996, that a preliminary report indicated that the quota had been exceeded, and processing of H-1B applications was temporarily halted.  However, when more accurate numbers became available on September 6, it became apparent the quota had not been reached after all, and processing resumed for the remainder of the fiscal year.

The United States Citizenship and Immigration Services starts accepting applications on the first business day of April for visas that count against the fiscal year starting in October. For instance, H-1B visa applications that count against the fiscal year 2013 cap were submitted starting Monday, 2012 April 2. USCIS accepts H-1B visa applications no more than 6 months in advance of the requested start date. Beneficiaries not subject to the annual cap are those who currently hold cap-subject H-1B status or have held cap-subject H-1B status at some point in the past six years.

Lottery 

Each year, generally on April 1, the H-1B season commences for the following federal fiscal year; employment authorizations are granted on October 1. Due to a pre-employment application limit window of six months, the first weekday in April is the earliest that an applicant may legally apply for the next year's allotment of cap-subject H-1B. H-1B "cap cases" are delineated on the envelope's label, preferably in red ink, with "Regular Cap" for the bachelor's degree, "C/S Cap" for H-1B1 treaty cases and "U.S. Master'"s for the U.S. master's degrees or higher exemption. USCIS publishes a memo when enough cap-subject applications have been received, indicating the closure of cap-subject application season, the associated random selection process is often referred to as the H-1B lottery.  Those who have the U.S. master's exemption have two chances to be selected in the lottery:  first, a regular lottery is held to award the 65,000 visas available to all H-1B applicants, and those not selected are then entered in another lottery for 20,000 extra spots.  Those without a U.S. master's are entered only in the first, regular, lottery.

Pro-H-1B pundits claim that the early closure, and number of applications received (172,500 in Fiscal Year 2015), are indications of employment demand and advocate increasing the 65,000 bachelor's degree cap.  David North, of the Center for Immigration Studies, claimed that unlike other immigration categories, H-1B filing fees, for applications which are not randomly selected, are refunded to the intending employer. However, applications that are not selected are simply returned unopened to the petitioner, with no money changing hands or refunded.

Computerworld and The New York Times have reported on the inordinate share of H-1B visas received by firms that specialize in offshore-outsourcing, the subsequent inability of employers to hire foreign professionals with legitimate technical and language skill combinations, and the outright replacement of American professionals already performing their job functions and being coerced to train their foreign replacements.

The United States Chamber of Commerce maintains a list of years when the random selection process (lottery) was implemented.

The lottery process was challenged in Tenrec v. USCIS, a class action lawsuit in Oregon, but the case was decided against the plaintiffs.

On June 28, 2021, the lottery process was challenged again in LIU et al. v. MAYORKAS et al., a lawsuit filed in United States District Court for the District of Columbia by 500+ FY 2022 H-1B applicants who didn't get selected in March 2021.

Tax status of an individual with H-1B status
The taxation of income for an individual with H-1B status depends on whether they are categorized as either nonresident aliens or resident aliens for tax purposes. A nonresident alien for tax purposes is only taxed on income that is effectively connected with a trade or business in the United States and United States-source income that is fixed, determinable, annual, or periodical. A resident alien for tax purposes is taxed on all income, including income from outside the United States.

The classification is determined based on the substantial presence test. If the substantial presence test indicates that the individual is a resident, then income taxation is like any other U.S. person and may be filed using Form 1040 and the necessary schedules. Otherwise, the individual must file as a non-resident alien using Form 1040NR or Form 1040NR-EZ; the individual may claim a benefit from tax treaties that exist between the United States and the individual's country of citizenship.

An individual in the first year in the U.S. may choose to be considered a resident for taxation purposes for the entire year, and must pay taxes on their worldwide income for that year. This first-year choice can only be made once in an individual's lifetime. A spouse, regardless of visa status, must include a valid Individual Taxpayer Identification Number or Social Security number on a joint tax return with the individual in H-1B status.

Tax filing rules for an individual in H-1B status may be complex, depending on the individual situation. A tax professional who is knowledgeable about the rules for foreigners may be consulted.

Social Security tax and Medicare tax
Employers must generally withhold Social Security and Medicare taxes from the wages paid to employees in H-1B status.

Similarly to U.S. citizens, a person who worked in H-1B status may be eligible to receive Social Security benefit payments at retirement. Generally, a worker must have worked in the U.S. and paid Social Security taxes obtaining at least 40 credits before retirement. The person will not be eligible for payments if the person moves outside the U.S. and is a citizen of a country with a social insurance system or a pension system that pays periodic payments upon old age, retirement, or death.

The U.S. has bilateral agreements with several countries to ensure that the credit granted into the U.S. Social Security system, even if it is fewer than 40 credits, is taken into account in the foreign country's comparable system and vice versa.

H-1B and intent to immigrate permanently 

Even though the H-1B visa is a non-immigrant visa, it is one of the few temporary visa categories recognized as dual intent, meaning an H-1B holder could legally have an immigration intent (apply for and obtain the green card) while still being a holder of the H-1B visa. However, this was only allowed in special cases by the USCIS, such as EB-1 visas. Effectively, the non-immigrant visa may eventually lead to permanent residence; companies often support it with the agreement to support the employee with green card petitions.

In the past, the employment-based green card process used to take only a few years, less than the duration of the H-1B visa itself because requirement to maintain a foreign address for this non-immigrant classification was removed in the Immigration Act of 1990. The Trump administration expressed its dislike of the use of the H-1B visa, a nonimmigrant visa, as a pathway to permanent residence, and it has said it intends to restructure the immigration/permanent residence pathway with efficient systems such as Points-based immigration system. In apparent response, some green card seekers look to alternatives, like the EB-5 visa, which offers better prospects for permanent immigration than the H-1B visa. As a response to the abuse of H-1B visas, groups like Progressives for Immigration Reform advertised opposition posters throughout San Francisco's Bay Area Rapid Transit (BART) stations and trains.

Dependents of H-1B visa holders
H-1B visa holders can bring immediate family members (spouse and children under 21) to the United States under the H-4 visa category as dependents.

An H-4 visa holder may remain in the U.S. as long as the H-1B visa holder retains legal status. An H-4 visa holder is allowed to attend school, apply for a driver's license, and open a bank account in the United States.

Effective May 26, 2015, United States Citizenship and Immigration Services allows some spouses of H-1B visa holders to apply for eligibility to work in the United States. The spouse would need to file Form I-765, Application for Employment Authorization, with supporting documents and the required filing fee. The spouse is authorized to work in the United States only after the Form I-765 is approved and the spouse receives an Employment Authorization Document card.

Administrative processing
When an H-1B worker travels outside the U.S. for any reason (other than to Canada or Mexico), he or she must have a valid visa stamped on his or her passport for re-entry in the United States. If the worker has an expired stamp but an unexpired i-797 petition, he or she will need to appear in a U.S. Embassy to get a new stamp. In some cases, H-1B workers can be required to undergo "administrative processing," involving extra background checks of different types.  Under current rules, these checks are supposed to take ten days or less, but in some cases, have lasted years.

Complications for entrepreneurs and consultants

The United States immigration system's EB-5 visa program permits foreign entrepreneurs to apply for a green card if they make a sufficient investment in a commercial enterprise and intend to create 10 or more jobs in the United States.  Dissatisfied with this mechanism, and taking advantage of the lack of a cap for H-1B visa issued to educational institutions, the University of Massachusetts began a program in 2014 that allows entrepreneurs to found U.S. companies while fulfilling visa requirements by teaching and mentoring on campus, with the university as sponsoring employer. Likewise, self-employed consultants have no visa that would allow them to enter the country and perform work independently for unspecified, extended periods (although, note that a B-1 visa would permit temporary travel to the U.S. to consult for specific periods), so consulting companies have been formed for the sole purpose of sponsoring employees on H-1B visas to allow them to perform work for clients, with the company sharing the resulting profit.

Application process
The process of getting a H-1B visa has three stages:

 The employer files with the United States Department of Labor a Labor Condition Application (LCA) for the employee, making relevant attestations, including attestations about wages (showing that the wage is at least equal to the prevailing wage and wages paid to others in the company in similar positions) and working conditions.
 With an approved Labor Condition Application, the employer files a Form I-129 (Petition for a Nonimmigrant Worker) requesting H-1B classification for the worker. This must be accompanied by necessary supporting documents and fees.
 Once the Form I-129 is approved, the worker may begin working with the H-1B classification on or after the indicated start date of the job, if already physically present in the United States in valid status at the time. If the employee is outside the United States, he/she may use the approved Form I-129 and supporting documents to apply for the H-1B visa. With a H-1B visa, the worker may present himself or herself at a United States port of entry seeking admission to the United States, and get a Form I-94 to enter the United States. (Employees who started a job on H-1B status without a H-1B visa because they were already in the United States still need to get a H-1B visa if they ever leave and wish to reenter the United States while on H-1B status.)

Premium processing

An applicant may choose to pay for Premium Processing Service. U.S. Citizenship and Immigration Services guarantees processing of applications and petitions within 15 calendar days. U.S. Citizenship and Immigration Services will send an approval notice, a denial notice, a notice of intent to deny, a request for additional evidence, or open an investigation for fraud or misrepresentation within 15 calendar days of receiving Form I-907: Request for Premium Processing Service. If the 15-calendar-day window is not satisfied, then the Premium Processing Fee will be refunded.

On March 3, 2017, U.S. Citizenship and Immigration Services announced on its website that beginning on April 3, 2017, it would temporarily suspend premium processing for all H-1B visa petitions until further notice. Premium processing resumed on October 3, 2017.

On March 20, 2018, premium processing was suspended for all cap-subject H-1B petitions for fiscal year 2019. On August 28, 2018, the premium processing suspension was extended and expanded to include all H-1B petitions filed at the Vermont Service Center and the California Service Center.

OPT science, technology, engineering, and mathematics (STEM) extension and cap-gap extension

On April 2, 2008, the U.S. Department of Homeland Security (DHS) Secretary Michael Chertoff announced a 17-month extension to the Optional Practical Training for students in qualifying STEM fields. The Optional Practical Training extension was included in the rule-change commonly referred to as the H-1B Cap-Gap Regulations. The OPT extension only benefits foreign STEM (Science, Technology, Engineering, or Mathematics) students and is not available to foreign students of other disciplines. The 17-month work-authorization extension allows the foreign STEM student to work up to 29 months in total on the student visa, allowing the STEM student multiple years to obtain an H-1B visa. To be eligible for the 12-month work-permit, any bachelor's degree in any field of study is valid. For the 17-month OPT extension, a student must have received a STEM degree in one of the approved majors listed on the USCIS website. The STEM extension can be combined with the cap-gap extension.

On March 11, 2016, the U.S. Department of Homeland Security (DHS) published its final rule on the science, technology, engineering and mathematics (STEM) optional practical training (OPT) extension. This final rule will go into effect on May 10, 2016, and at that time will replace the current 17-month STEM OPT extension.DHS extended the period of time from 17 months to 24 months and strengthened oversight of the program by adding new features.  

In 2014, a federal court denied the government's motion to dismiss the Washington Alliance of Technology Workers (Washtech) and three other plaintiffs' case against the OPT STEM extension. Judge Huvelle noted that the plaintiffs had standing due to increased competition in their field, that the OPT participation had ballooned from 28,500 in 2008, to 123,000 and that while the students are working under OPT on student visas, employers are not required to pay Social Security and Medicare contributions, nor prevailing wage.

On August 9, 2018, U.S. Citizenship and Immigration Services issued a policy memorandum changing how the agency calculates unlawful presence for students and exchange visitors in F, J, and M nonimmigrant status, including F-2, J-2, and M-2 dependents, who fail to maintain status in the United States. Additional information is available on the Unlawful Presence and Bars to Admissibility page.

History

Creation
On June 27, 1952, Congress passed the Immigration and Nationality Act after overriding a veto by President Harry S. Truman. For the first time, the Immigration and Nationality Act codified United States' immigration, naturalization, and nationality law into permanent statutes, and it introduced a system of selective immigration by giving special preference to foreigners possessing skills that are urgently needed by the country. Several different types of visas were established, including a H-1 visa for "an alien having a residence in a foreign country which he has no intention of abandoning who is of distinguished merit and ability and who is coming temporarily to the United States to perform temporary services of an exceptional nature requiring such merit and ability." The term "distinguished merit and ability" was not new to United States immigration law; it had previously been used as a qualification for musicians and artists who had wanted to enter the United States. The visa was called an H-1 visa because it had been made into law by section 101(15)(H)(1) of the Immigration and Nationality Act.

Immigration Act of 1990
The Immigration Act of 1990 was signed into law by President George H. W. Bush on November 20, 1990. The H-1 visa was replaced by two different visas. An H-1A visa was created for nurses, and the H-1B visa was established for workers in a "specialty occupation". The Immigration Act defined a specialty occupation as "an occupation that requires theoretical and practical application of a body of highly specialized knowledge, and attainment of a bachelor's or higher degree in the specific specialty (or its equivalent) as a minimum for entry into the occupation in the United States". In order to qualify, a visa applicant needed any applicable state license for the particular occupation and either an educational degree related to the occupation or an equivalent amount of professional experience. For the first time, there was established a quota of 65,000 H-1B visas available each fiscal year, rather than an unlimited amount before. An employer was required by law to pay such employees at least the prevailing wage for the position, and employers were required to make certain attestations by way of a Labor Condition Application.

American Competitiveness and Workforce Improvement Act of 1998
President Bill Clinton signed the American Competitiveness and Workforce Improvement Act into law on October 21, 1998. The law required that each application for an H-1B must include an additional $500 payment, which would be used for retraining U.S. workers in order to reduce the need for H-1B visas in the future. The quota of H-1B visas was increased from 65,000 to 115,000 for fiscal years 1999 and 2000 only. For an employer with a large number of employees in H-1B status or who had committed a willful misrepresentation in the recent past, the employer attest that the additional H-1B worker would not displace any U.S. workers. The act also gave investigative authority to the United States Department of Labor.

American Competitiveness in the 21st Century Act of 2000
On October 17, 2000, the American Competitiveness in the 21st Century Act was signed by President Bill Clinton. Under the law, the required retraining fee was increased from $500 to $1,000. The quota was increased to 195,000 H-1B visas in fiscal years 2001, 2002, and 2003 only. Nonprofit research institutions sponsoring workers for H-1B visas became exempt from the H-1B visa quotas.

Under the law, a worker in H-1B status who had already been subject to a visa quota would not be subject to quotas if requesting a transfer to a new employer or if applying for a three-year extension. An H-1B worker became allowed to change employers if the worker had an I-485 application pending for six months and an approved I-140 and if the new position is substantially comparable to their current position.

In the case of an H-1B holder's spouse in H-4 status, the spouse may be eligible to work in the United States under certain circumstances. The spouse must have an approved "Immigration Petition for Alien Worker" form or the spouse must have been given H-1B status under sections 106(a) and (b) of the American Competitiveness in the 21st Century Act of 2000.

Singapore–United States and Chile–United States Free Trade Agreements in 2003
Congress ratified the Singapore–United States Free Trade Agreement in 2003. It ratified the Chile–United States Free Trade Agreement later that year. With these free trade agreements, a new H-1B1 visa was established as being available solely for people from either Singapore or Chile. Unlike H-1B visas that had a limited renewal time, H-1B1 visas can be renewed indefinitely. H-1B1 visas are subject to a separate quota of 6,000 per fiscal year. Unlike H-1B visas, an H-1B1 visa is not a dual-intent visa, and an H-1B1 applicant must convince the visa officer that they have no intention of permanently immigrating to the United States.

H-1B Visa Reform Act of 2004
The H-1B Visa Reform Act of 2004 was a part of the Consolidated Appropriations Act, 2005, which President George W. Bush signed on December 6, 2004. For employers with 26 or more employees, the required retraining fee was increased from $1,000 to $1,500, and it was reduced to $750 for all other employers. A new $500 "anti-fraud fee" was established that was required to be paid by the employer with the visa application. While the H-1B quota returned to 65,000 per year, the law added 20,000 visas for applicants with J-1 status with either a master's degree or a doctorate degree from a U.S. graduate school. Governmental entities became exempt from H-1B visa quotas. According to the law, H-1B visas that were revoked due to either fraud or willful misrepresentation would be added to the H-1B visa quota for the following fiscal year. The law also allowed one-year extensions of H-1B for H-1B visa holders who were applying for permanent residency and whose petitions had been pending for a long time. The United States Department of Labor had more investigative authority, but an employer could defend against misdeeds by using either the Good Faith Compliance Defense or the Recognized Industry Standards Defense.

Consolidated Natural Resources Act of 2008
The Consolidated Natural Resources Act of 2008 federalized immigration in the U.S. territory of the Commonwealth of the Northern Mariana Islands, and it stipulated that, during a transition period, numerical limitations would not apply to otherwise qualified workers in the H visa category in the U.S. territories of Guam and the Commonwealth of the Northern Mariana Islands. The exemption does not apply to any employment to be performed outside of Guam or the Commonwealth of the Northern Mariana Islands.

Employ American Workers Act of 2009
The Employ American Workers Act, as part of the American Recovery and Reinvestment Act of 2009, was signed into law by President Barack Obama on February 17, 2009. For employers who applied to sponsor a new H-1B and who had received funds under either the Troubled Asset Relief Program (TARP) or the Federal Reserve Act Section 13, the employers were required to attest that the additional H-1B worker would not displace any U.S. workers and that the employer had not laid off, and would not lay off, any U.S. worker in a job equivalent to the H-1B position in the area of intended employment of the H-1B worker within the period beginning 90 days prior to the filing of the H-1B petition and ending 90 days after its filing.

2010 memorandum about employee-employer relationship
On January 8, 2010, United States Citizenship and Immigration Services issued a memorandum stating that there must be a clear employee-employer relationship between the petitioner (employer) and the beneficiary (prospective visa holder). The memorandum outlines what the employer must do to be considered in compliance as well as putting forth the documentation requirements to back up the employer's assertion that a valid relationship exists.

An employer must maintain a valid employee-employer relationship throughout the period of the worker's stay in the United States. The employer must have actual control or the right to control the employee and to be able to decide when, where, and how the employee will be employed and performs work.

A valid employee-employer relationship typically includes many of the following: supervising the worker on- and off-site; maintaining such supervision through calls, reports, or visits; having a right to control the work on a day-to-day basis if such control is required; providing the worker with the tools and equipment needed for the job; having the ability to hire, pay, and terminate the worker's job; evaluating the worker's products, progress, and performance; provision of some type of employee benefits; allowing the worker to use the employer's proprietary information when performing work; assigning work to the worker that produces an end-product related to the employer's business; and having the ability to control the manner and means in which the worker accomplishes tasks. The memorandum further states that "common law is flexible about how these factors are to be weighed".

Third-party placement firms and staffing firms do not qualify for H-1B status because they fail the control test.

2015 rule about work authorization for certain H-4 holders
In 2015, the U.S. Department of Homeland Security issued a rule that allowed certain spouses of H-1B workers to be eligible for work authorization.

Under the rule, the H-1B worker must either be the principal beneficiary of an approved Immigrant Petition for Alien Worker (Form I-140) or have H-1B status under the American Competitiveness in the Twenty-first Century Act of 2000, as amended by the 21st Century Department of Justice Appropriations Authorization Act, and the spouse must be in the United States with H-4 status.

The U.S. Department of Homeland Security stated that it issued the rule in order to ease the financial burden that these families may experience as they transition from nonimmigrant to lawfully permanent resident status. The rule also reduces disincentives for H-1B workers to leave the United States, which disrupts the United States businesses employing these workers.

2015 final guidance on changes of work site
In 2015, United States Citizenship and Immigration Services issued final guidance stating that an H-1B worker whose work site location of changes to a different metropolitan area, the change is considered a material change that requires the employer to certify a new Labor Condition Application to the Department of Homeland Security. Temporary changes of work site do not require a new Labor Condition Application, such as when the H-1B worker attends a training session, a seminar, or a conference of a short duration or when the H-1B worker is temporarily moved to a short-term placements of less than 30 days. If the amended H-1B petition is disapproved but the original petition remains valid, then the H-1B worker retains their H-1B status as long as they return to work at the original work site.

2016 clarification on maximum period of stay
On December 5, 2016, United States Citizenship and Immigration Services issued a memorandum to provide guidance regarding periods of admissions for an individual in H-1B status. The memorandum stated that time spent as either an H-4 dependent or an L-2 dependent does not reduce the maximum allowable period of stay available to individuals in H-1B status.

2017 rule allowing a grace period after end of employment
On November 18, 2017, United States Citizenship and Immigration Services released a rule that affects individuals in H-1B status whose employment ends. In these cases, the individual has a grace period of 60 days to leave the United States or change to another legal status that allows them to remain in the United States.

2017 work authorization victims of domestic violence
In 2005, the Violence Against Women and Department of Justice Reauthorization Act of 2005 allowed work authorization for victims of domestic violence who are in H-4 status. On February 17, 2017, United States Citizenship and Immigration Services instituted a process for these victims to apply for work authorization.

Eligible individuals include an individual who is currently married to a H-1B worker; an individual whose deceased spouse was in H-1B status at death; an individual whose spouse lost H-1B status because of an incident of domestic violence; or an individual whose marriage to a H-1B worker ended because of battery or extreme cruelty perpetrated by the individual's former spouse. The individual must also have entered the United States in an H status, must continue to be in H-4 status, and were themselves or their child battered or subjected to extreme cruelty perpetrated by the H-1B spouse. Among other things, the spouse's application must include evidence of the abuse, such as protection orders, police reports, court records, medical records, reports from social services agencies, a signed statement from the applicant detailing abuse suffered since your admission to the United States, and/or affidavits from other people who can knowledgeably attest to the abuse experienced.

Before this policy was implemented, an abused spouse in H-4 status would be required to leave the United States the date the person divorced the abusive spouse. The divorced spouse now has a way to legally remain in the United States and legally work in the United States after the divorce is finalized or pending. If approved, the authorization is valid for two years.

2017 memorandum on computer-programming positions
A memorandum from December 22, 2000, stated that, because most computer-programming positions required a bachelor's degree, computer programming was considered a specialty occupation that qualified for an H-1B visa. On March 31, 2017, United States Citizenship and Immigration Services released a memorandum stating that computer programming would no longer be automatically considered a specialty occupation, partly because a bachelor's degree was no longer typically required of these positions. An application for an H-1B visa for a computer programmer must sufficiently describe the duties and the level of experience and responsibilities of computer-programming positions in order to demonstrate how the position is a senior, complex, specialized, or unique computer-programming position rather than an entry-level position in order to qualify for an H-1B visa.

In addition, the United States Department of Justice warned employers not to discriminate against U.S. workers by showing a preference for hiring H-1B workers.

Proposed reform in 2017 and 2018
In 2017, the U.S. Congress considered more than doubling the minimum wage required for an H-1B holder from the $60,000 (USD) established in 1989 and unchanged since then. The High Skilled Integrity and Fairness Act, introduced by U.S. Rep. Zoe Lofgren of California, would raise H-1B holders' minimum salaries to $130,000. The action was criticized in the Indian press for confirming "the worst fears of [Indian] IT companies" in the wake of the reforms discussed during the 2016 Presidential election by both major candidates, and for causing a 5% drop in the BSE SENSEX index. Though, India in general has been welcoming this change and requirement since 2015. Lofgren's office described it as a measure to "curb outsourcing abuse" citing unfair tech hiring practices by employers including Disney and University of California San Francisco.

On April 18, 2017, President Trump signed an executive order that directed federal agencies to implement a "Buy American, Hire American" strategy.

At a press briefing, the Department of Labor, Department of Justice, Department of Homeland Security, and Department of State said that an executive order will direct federal agencies to implement a new system that favors higher-skilled, higher-paid applicants. The executive order is the first initiative in response to a key pledge made by Trump during his presidential campaign to promote a "Buy American, Hire American" policy. The executive order is intended to order federal agencies to review and propose reforms to the H-1B visa system. Through the executive order, Trump stated his broad policy of economic nationalism without having to go through Congress. The Secretary of Labor, Attorney General, Secretary of Homeland Security, and Secretary of State will "fill in the details with reports and recommendations about what the administration can legally do." Trump said that the executive would "end the theft of American prosperity," which he said had been brought on by low-wage immigrant labor.

On January 9, 2018, the USCIS said that it was not considering any proposal that would force H-1B visa holders to leave the United States during the green-card process.  USCIS said an employer could request extensions in one-year increments under section 106(a)–(b) of the American Competitiveness in the 21st Century Act instead.

2018 effect of extension disapprovals
On June 28, 2018, the United States Citizenship and Immigration Services announced that, when a person's request for a visa extension is rejected, the person will be deported from the United States. The Trump administration said they are not considering any proposal that would force H-1B visa holders to leave the country.

Suspension of entry in 2020
On April 22, 2020, President Donald Trump signed a presidential proclamation that temporarily suspended the entry of people with non-immigrant visas, including H-1B visas. On June 22, 2020, President Trump extended the suspension for H-1B visa holders until December 31, 2020. On December 31, 2020, President Trump issued a presidential proclamation extending the suspension of entry until March 31, 2021, because they would pose "a risk of displacing and disadvantaging United States workers during the economic recovery following the COVID-19 outbreak".

President Joe Biden allowed the suspension to expire on March 31, 2021, which allowed H-1B visa holders to enter the U.S. beginning on April 1, 2021.

Protections for U.S. workers

Labor Condition Application

The U.S. Department of Labor (DOL) is responsible for ensuring that foreign workers do not displace or adversely affect wages or working conditions of U.S. workers. For every H-1B petition filed with the USCIS, there must be included a Labor Condition Application (LCA) (not to be confused with the labor certification), certified by the U.S. Department of Labor. The LCA is designed to ensure that the wage offered to the non-immigrant worker meets or exceeds the "prevailing wage" in the area of employment.  ("Immigration law has a number of highly technical terms that may not mean the same thing to the average reader.") The LCA also contains an attestation section designed to prevent the program from being used to import foreign workers to break a strike or replace U.S. citizen workers.

While an employer is not required to advertise the position before hiring an H-1B non-immigrant pursuant to the H-1B visa approval, the employer must notify the employee representative about the Labor Condition Application (LCA)—or if there is no such representation, the employer must publish the LCA at the workplace and the employer's office. Under the regulations, LCAs are a matter of public record. Corporations hiring H-1B workers are required to make these records available to any member of the public who requests to look at them. Copies of the relevant records are also available from various web sites, including the Department of Labor.

History of the Labor Condition Application form
The LCA must be filed electronically using Form ETA 9035E. Over the years, the complexity of the form increased from one page in 1997 to three pages in 2008, to five pages as of August 2012.

Employer attestations
By signing the LCA, the employer attests that:
 The employer pays H-1B non-immigrants the same wage level paid to all other individuals with similar experience and qualifications for that specific employment, or the prevailing wage for the occupation in the area of employment, whichever is higher.
 The employment of H-1B non-immigrants does not adversely affect working conditions of workers similarly employed.
 On the date the application is signed and submitted, there is not a strike, lockout, or work stoppage in the course of a labor dispute in the occupation in which H-1B non-immigrants will be employed at the place of employment. If such a strike or lockout occurs after this application is submitted, the employer must notify the DOL's Employment and Training Administration (ETA) within three days, and the application is not used to support petition filings with USCIS (formerly known as INS) for H-1B non-immigrants to work in the same occupation at the place of employment until ETA determines the strike or lockout is over.
 A copy of this application has been, or will be, provided to each H-1B non-immigrant employed pursuant to this application, and, as of the application date, notice of this application has been provided to workers employed in the occupation in which H-1B non-immigrants will be employed:
 Notice of this filing has been provided to bargaining representative of workers in the occupation in which H-1B non-immigrants will be employed; or
 There is no such bargaining representative; therefore, a notice of this filing has been posted and was, or will remain, posted for 10 days in at least two conspicuous locations where H-1B non-immigrants will be employed.

The law requires H-1B workers to be paid the higher of the prevailing wage for the same occupation and geographic location, or the same as the employer pays to similarly situated employees. Other factors, such as age and skill were not permitted to be taken into account for the prevailing wage. Congress changed the program in 2004 to require the Department of Labor to provide four skill-based prevailing wage levels for employers to use. This is the only prevailing wage mechanism the law permits that incorporates factors other than occupation and location.

The approval process for these applications are based on employer attestations and documentary evidence submitted. The employer is advised of their liability if they are replacing a U.S. worker.

Limits on employment authorization
USCIS clearly states the following concerning H-1B nonimmigrants' employment authorization.

When a H-1B nonimmigrant works with multiple employers, if any of employers fail to file the petition, it is considered as an unauthorized employment and the nonimmigrant fails to maintain the status.

H-1B fees earmarked for U.S. worker education and training
In 2007, the U.S. Department of Labor, Employment and Training Administration (ETA), reported on two programs, the High Growth Training Initiative and Workforce Innovation Regional Economic Development (WIRED), which have received or will receive $284 million and $260 million, respectively, from H-1B training fees to educate and train U.S. workers.
According to the Seattle Times $1 billion from H-1B fees have been distributed by the Labor Department to further train the U.S. workforce since 2001.

Impact
Studies have shown that H-1B visas have welfare-improving effects for Americans, leading to significant wage gains, lower consumer prices, greater innovation, and greater total factor productivity growth. While H-1B visas lead to lower wages and employment for competing U.S. workers, H-1B visas have led to lower prices for consumers, greater output, and improved performance by companies. H-1B visa holders have been associated with greater innovation and economic performance.

Criticisms of the program

The H-1B program has been criticized on many grounds. It was the subject of a hearing, "Immigration Reforms Needed to Protect Skilled American Workers," by the United States Senate Committee on the Judiciary on March 17, 2015. According to Senator Chuck Grassley of Iowa, chairman of the committee:

According to the editorial board of The New York Times, speaking in June 2015, loopholes and lax enforcement of the H-1B visa program has resulted in exploitation of both visa holders and American workers.

Use for outsourcing
In some cases, rather than being used to hire talented workers not available in the American labor market, the program is being used for outsourcing. Senators Dick Durbin of Illinois and Charles Grassley of Iowa began introducing "The H-1B and L-1 Visa Fraud & Prevention Act" in 2007. According to Durbin, speaking in 2009, "The H-1B visa program should complement the U.S. workforce, not replace it;" "The…program is plagued with fraud and abuse and is now a vehicle for outsourcing that deprives qualified American workers of their jobs." The proposed legislation has been opposed by Compete America, a tech industry lobbying group,

In June 2015, ten Senators requested the U.S. Department of Labor open an investigation of outsourcing of technical tasks by Southern California Edison to Tata Consultancy Services and Infosys then laying off 500 technology workers. After a ten-month investigation, the U.S. Department of Labor determined that no charges should be filed against any of the firms.

No labor shortages
Paul Donnelly, in a 2002 article in Computerworld, cited Milton Friedman as stating that the H-1B program acts as a subsidy for corporations. Others holding this view include Norman Matloff, who testified to the U.S. House Judiciary Committee Subcommittee on Immigration on the H-1B subject. Matloff's paper for the University of Michigan Journal of Law Reform claims that there has been no shortage of qualified American citizens to fill American computer-related jobs, and that the data offered as evidence of American corporations needing H-1B visas to address labor shortages was erroneous. The United States General Accounting Office found in a report in 2000 that controls on the H-1B program lacked effectiveness. The GAO report's recommendations were subsequently implemented.

High-tech companies often cite a tech-worker shortage when asking Congress to raise the annual cap on H-1B visas, and have succeeded in getting various exemptions passed.  The American Immigration Lawyers Association (AILA), described the situation as a crisis, and the situation was reported on by the Wall Street Journal, BusinessWeek and Washington Post. Employers applied pressure on Congress. Microsoft chairman Bill Gates testified in 2007 on behalf of the expanded visa program on Capitol Hill, "warning of dangers to the U.S. economy if employers can't import skilled workers to fill job gaps." Congress considered a bill to address the claims of shortfall but in the end did not revise the program.

According to a study conducted by John Miano and the Center for Immigration Studies, there is no empirical data to support a claim of employee worker shortage.  Citing studies from Duke, Alfred P. Sloan Foundation, Georgetown University and others, critics have also argued that in some years, the number of foreign programmers and engineers imported outnumbered the number of jobs created by the industry. Hire Americans First has also posted hundreds of first hand accounts of H-1B visa harm reports directly from individuals negatively impacted by the program, many of whom are willing to speak with the media. A study by economist Morgan Raux found that domestic employers are 28 percent more likely to apply for an H-1B visa when job postings are posted for longer periods of time. That effect is stronger in engineering and computer science applications, where employers are 50 percent more likely to apply for visas.

Studies carried out from the 1990s through 2011 by researchers from Columbia U, Computing Research Association (CRA), Duke U, Georgetown U, Harvard U, National Research Council of the NAS, RAND Corporation, Rochester Institute of Technology, Rutgers U, Alfred P. Sloan Foundation, Stanford U, SUNY Buffalo, UC Davis, UPenn Wharton School, Urban Institute, and U.S. Dept. of Education Office of Education Research & Improvement have reported that the U.S. has been producing sufficient numbers of able and willing STEM (Science, Technology, Engineering and Mathematics) workers, while several studies from Hal Salzman, B. Lindsay Lowell, Daniel Kuehn, Michael Teitelbaum and others have concluded that the U.S. has been employing only 30% to 50% of its newly degreed able and willing STEM workers to work in STEM fields. A 2012 IEEE announcement of a conference on STEM education funding and job markets stated "only about half of those with under-graduate STEM degrees actually work in the STEM-related fields after college, and after 10 years, only some 8% still do."

Ron Hira, a professor of public policy at Howard University and a longtime critic of the H-1B visa program, recently called the IT talent shortage "imaginary," a front for companies that want to hire relatively inexpensive foreign guest workers.

Wage depression
Wage depression is a chronic complaint critics have about the H-1B program. The Department of Homeland Security annual report indicates that H-1B workers in the field of Computer Science are paid a mean salary of $75,000 annually (2014) almost 25,000 dollars below the average annual income for software developers  and studies have found that H-1B workers are paid significantly less than U.S. workers. It is claimed that the H-1B program is primarily used as a source of cheap labor. A paper by George J. Borjas for the National Bureau of Economic Research found that "a 10 percent immigration-induced increase in the supply of doctorates lowers the wage of competing workers by about 3 to 4 percent." A 2016 study found that H-1B visas kept wages for U.S. computer scientists 2.6% to 5.1% lower, and employment in computer science for U.S. workers 6.1% to 10.8% lower, but resulted in greater production efficiency, lowered the prices of IT products, raised the output of IT products and caused substantially higher profits for IT firms.

The Labor Condition Application (LCA) included in the H-1B petition is supposed to ensure that H-1B workers are paid the prevailing wage in the labor market, or the employer's actual average wage (whichever is higher), but evidence exists that some employers do not abide by these provisions and avoid paying the actual prevailing wage despite stiff penalties for abusers.

Theoretically, the LCA process appears to offer protection to both U.S. and H-1B workers. However, according to the U.S. General Accounting Office, enforcement limitations and procedural problems render these protections ineffective. Ultimately, the employer, not the Department of Labor, determines what sources determine the prevailing wage for an offered position, and it may choose among a variety of competing surveys, including its own wage surveys, provided that such surveys follow certain defined rules and regulations.

The law specifically restricts the Department of Labor's approval process of LCAs to checking for "completeness and obvious inaccuracies." In FY 2005, only about 800 LCAs were rejected out of over 300,000 submitted. Hire Americans First has posted several hundred first hand accounts of individuals negatively impacted by the program.

According to attorney John Miano, the H-1B prevailing wage requirement is "rife" with loopholes.  Ron Hira, assistant professor of public policy at the Rochester Institute of Technology, compiled the median wage in 2005 for new H-1B information technology (IT), these wages were found to $50,000, lower than starting wages for IT graduates with a B.S. degree. The U.S. government OES office's data indicates that 90% of H-1B IT wages were below the median U.S. wage and 62% in the 25th percentile for the same occupation.

In 2002, the U.S. government began an investigation into Sun Microsystems' hiring practices after an ex-employee, Guy Santiglia, filed complaints with the U.S. Department of Justice and U.S. Department of Labor alleging that the Santa Clara firm discriminates against American citizens in favor of foreign workers on H-1B visas. Santiglia accused the company of bias against U.S. citizens when it laid off 3,900 workers in late 2001 and at the same time applied for thousands of visas. In 2002, about 5 percent of Sun's 39,000 employees had temporary work visas, he said. In 2005, it was decided that Sun violated only minor requirements and that neither of these violations was substantial or willful. Thus, the judge only ordered Sun to change its posting practices.

2016 presidential election and the H-1B visa

The H-1B visa became an issue in the 2016 United States presidential election. According to Computerworld, candidate Donald Trump took a stance to "pause" and re-write the H-1B system. Additionally, during some of his rallies he invited guest speakers to raise awareness of the hundreds of IT workers who were displaced by H-1B guest workers. Candidate Hillary Clinton spoke negatively of H-1B workers being hired because they are less expensive and since they are reliant on the employer, more likely to be compliant during abuse. Clinton said that she was unlikely to consider the H-1B system individually and only would look towards reforms as part of a comprehensive immigration reform.

Presidential candidate Bernie Sanders opposed guest worker programs and was also skeptical about skilled immigrant (H-1B) visas, saying, "Last year, the top 10 employers of H-1B guest workers were all offshore outsourcing companies. These firms are responsible for shipping large numbers of American information technology jobs to India and other countries." In an interview with Vox he stated his opposition to an open borders immigration policy, describing it as:

...a right-wing proposal, which says essentially there is no United States...you're doing away with the concept of a nation-state.  What right-wing people in this country would love is an open-border policy. Bring in all kinds of people, work for $2 or $3 an hour, that would be great for them. I don't believe in that. I think we have to raise wages in this country, I think we have to do everything we can to create millions of jobs.

Risks for employees
Historically, H-1B holders have sometimes been described as indentured servants, and while the comparison is no longer as compelling, it had more validity prior to the passage of American Competitiveness in the Twenty-First Century Act of 2000. Indeed, guest workers on H-1B visas in the IT sector have a significant degree of inter-firm mobility. Although immigration generally requires short- and long-term visitors to disavow any ambition to seek the green card (permanent residency), H-1B visa holders are an important exception, in that the H-1B is legally acknowledged as a possible step towards a green card under what is called the doctrine of dual intent.

H-1B visa holders may be sponsored for their green cards by their employers through an Application for Alien Labor Certification, filed with the U.S. Department of Labor. In the past, the sponsorship process has taken several years, and for much of that time the H-1B visa holder was unable to change jobs without losing their place in line for the green card. This created an element of enforced loyalty to an employer by an H-1B visa holder. Critics alleged that employers benefit from this enforced loyalty because it reduced the risk that the H-1B employee might leave the job and go work for a competitor, and that it put citizen workers at a disadvantage in the job market, since the employer has less assurance that the citizen will stay at the job for an extended period of time, especially if the work conditions are tough, wages are lower or the work is difficult or complex. It has been argued that this makes the H-1B program extremely attractive to employers, and that labor legislation in this regard has been influenced by corporations seeking and benefiting from such advantages.

Some recent news reports suggest that the recession that started in 2008 will exacerbate the H-1B visa situation, both for supporters of the program and for those who oppose it. The process to obtain the green card has become so long that during these recession years it has not been unusual that sponsoring companies fail and disappear, thus forcing the H-1B employee to find another sponsor, and lose their place in line for the green card. An H-1B employee could be just one month from obtaining their green card, but if the employee is laid off, he or she may have to leave the country, or go to the end of the line and start over the process to get the green card, and wait as much as 15 more years, depending on the nationality and visa category.

The American Competitiveness in the Twenty-First Century Act of 2000 provides some relief for people waiting for a long time for a green card, by allowing H-1B extensions past the normal 6 years, as well as by making it easier to change the sponsoring employer.

Some workers who come to the U.S. on H-1B visas receive poor, unfair, and illegal treatment by brokers who place them with jobs in the US, according to a report published in 2014.  The United States Trafficking Victims Protection Reauthorization Act of 2013 was passed to help protect the rights of foreign workers in the United States, and the U.S. Department of State distributes pamphlets to inform foreign workers of their rights.

The out-sourcing/off-shoring visa

In his floor statement on H-1B visa reform, Senator Dick Durbin stated "The H-1B job visa lasts for three years and can be renewed for three years. What happens to those workers after that? Well, they could stay. It is possible. But these new companies have a much better idea for making money. They send the engineers to America to fill spots—and get money to do it—and then after the three to six years, they bring them back to work for the companies that are competing with American companies. They call it their outsourcing visa. They are sending their talented engineers to learn how Americans do business and then bring them back and compete with those American companies." Critics of H-1B use for outsourcing have also noted that more H-1B visas are granted to companies headquartered in India than companies headquartered in the United States.

Of all computer systems analysts and programmers on H-1B visas in the U.S., 74 percent were from Asia. This large scale migration of Asian IT professionals to the United States has been cited as a central cause for the quick emergence of the offshore outsourcing industry.

In FY 2009, due to the worldwide recession, applications for H-1B visas by offshore outsourcing firms were significantly lower than in previous years, yet 110,367 H-1B visas were issued, and 117,409 were issued in FY2010.

Departure requirement on job loss
If an employer lays off an H-1B worker, the employer is required to pay for the laid-off worker's transportation outside the United States.

If an H-1B worker is laid off or quits, the worker has a grace period of 60 days or until the I-94 expiration date, whichever is shorter, to find a new employer or leave the country.

There also is a 10-day grace period for an H-1B worker to depart the United States at the end of his/her authorized period of stay. This grace period only applies if the worker works until the H-1B expiration date listed on his/her I-797 approval notice, or I-94 card.

American workers are ordered to train their foreign replacements
There have been cases where employers used the program to replace their American employees with H-1B employees, and in some of those cases, the American employees were even ordered to train their replacements.

Fraud
The United States Citizenship and Immigration Services "H-1B Benefit Fraud & Compliance Assessment" of September 2008 concluded 21% of H-1B visas granted originate from fraudulent applications or applications with technical violations. Fraud was defined as a willful misrepresentation, falsification, or omission of a material fact. Technical violations, errors, omissions, and failures to comply that are not within the fraud definition were included in the 21% rate.

In 2009, federal authorities arrested people for a nationwide H-1B visa scam in which they allegedly submitted false statements and documents in connection with petitions for H-1B visas.

Fraud has included acquisition of a fake university degree for the prospective H-1B worker, coaching the worker on lying to consul officials, hiring a worker for which there is no U.S. job, charging the worker money to be hired, benching the worker with no pay, and taking a cut of the worker's U.S. salary. The workers, who have little choice in the matter, are also engaged in fraud, and may be charged, fined, and deported.

Similar visas

Selected listing of non-family preference visas where employment can be or is authorized. 

Temporary high skill visas
 H-1B visa (Bachelor's degree or equivalent)
 H-4 visa (Dependents of H visa—some now authorized for employment ) 
 L-1 visa (Intracompany)
 O-1 visa (Extraordinary abilities)
 TN visa (NAFTA)
 AC21 (Extends H-1B & L-1 visas beyond limitation statutes)

Student visas
 F visa (student visa)
 J visa (training and misc., employment (FICA exempt))
 Optional Practical Training (employment authorization, FICA exempt)

Employment based preference (Greencard)
 EB-1 visa (PhD level)
 EB-2 visa (Master's degree)
 EB-3 visa (Bachelor's degree)
 EB-4 visa (Religious)
 EB-5 visa (Investor)

Various
 B visa (business and visitor)
 P visa (athletes and entertainers)
 H-2A Visa (agriculture)
 H-2B visa (temporary worker, non agricultural)

In addition to H-1B visas, there are a variety of other visa categories that allow foreign workers to come into the U.S. to work for some period of time.

L-1 visas are issued to foreign employees of a corporation.  Under recent rules, the foreign worker must have worked for the corporation for at least one year in the preceding three years prior to getting the visa.  An L-1B visa is appropriate for non-immigrant workers who are being temporarily transferred to the United States based on their specialized knowledge of the company's techniques and methodologies.  An L-1A visa is for managers or executives who either manage people or an essential function of the company. There is no requirement to pay prevailing wages for the L-1 visa holders.  For Canadian residents, a special L visa category is available.

TN-1 visas are part of the North American Free Trade Agreement (NAFTA), and are issued to Canadian and Mexican citizens.  TN visas are only available to workers who fall into one of a preset list of occupations determined by the NAFTA treaty. There are specific eligibility requirements for the TN Visa.

E-3 visas are issued to citizens of Australia under the Australia free-trade treaty.

H-1B1 visas are a sub-set of H-1B issued to residents of Chile and Singapore. H-1B1 visas for residents of Chile was part of the Chile–United States Free Trade Agreement; PL 108-77 Section 402(a)(2)(B), 117 Stat. 909, 940; S 1416, HR 2738, which was passed by the U.S. House of Representatives on July 24, 2003. H-1B1 visas for residents of Singapore was part of the Singapore–United States Free Trade Agreement, PL 108-78 Section 402(2), 117 Stat. 948, 970-971; S 1417, HR 2739, which passed the U.S. House of Representatives on July 24, 2003, passed the U.S. Senate on July 31, 2003, and signed by President George W. Bush on May 6, 2003. According to U.S. Citizenship and Immigration Services, if there are any unused H-1B1 visas during a particular year, that number is added to the following year's H-1B base quota.

One recent trend in work visas is that various countries attempt to get special preference for their nationals as part of treaty negotiations.  Another trend is for changes in immigration law to be embedded in large Authorization or Omnibus bills to avoid the controversy that might accompany a separate vote.

H-2B visa: The H-2B non-immigrant program permits employers to hire foreign workers to come to the U.S. and perform temporary non-agricultural work, which may be one-time, seasonal, peak load or intermittent. There is a 66,000 per year limit on the number of foreign workers who may receive H-2B status.

H-1B demographics and tables

H-1B applications approved

H-1B visas issued per year

Top H-1B employers by visas approved

Use for other countries

An individual with a valid H-1B visa does not need a visa to enter Costa Rica for tourism for up to 30 days.  The H-1B visa must be stamped in the passport and be valid for at least six months. The passport needs to be valid for at least six months after entering Costa Rica.

See also
 Free trade debate
 Immigration Voice
 Disney litigation

Notes

References
United States Citizenship and Immigration Service, "Characteristics of Specialty Occupation Workers (H-1B)," for FY 2004 and FY 2005, November 2006.
 "Microsoft Cuts 5,000 Jobs as Recession Curbs Growth (Update5)", Bloomberg, 22 Jan 2009 (Microsoft Lays off 5,000 even as they use 3,117 visas in 2006.)
Bill Gates, Chairman of Microsoft, Testimony to the U.S. Senate Committee Health, Education, Labor, and Pensions. Hearing "Strengthening American Competitiveness for the 21st Century." March 7, 2007
 Business Week, Immigration: Google Makes Its Case, 7 Jun 2007.
 Business Week, Who Gets Temp Work Visas? 7 Jun 2007 (Top 200 H-1B Visa Users Chart)
 Business Week, Immigration Fight: Tech vs. Tech, 25 May 2007.
 Business Week, Crackdown on Indian Outsourcing Firms, 15 May 2007.
 Dr. Norman Matloff, Debunking the Myth of a Desperate Software Labor Shortage, Testimony to the U.S. House Judiciary Committee, April 1998, updated December 2002
 CNN, Lou Dobbs, Programmers Guild Interview & Transcript, August 26, 2005
 Congressional Record: Illegal Aliens Taking American Jobs, June 18, 2003 (House)
 Center for Immigration Studies, Backgrounder: The bottom of the pay scale, Wages for H-1B Computer Programmer's, John Milano, 2005.

Further reading
 Pittsburgh law firm's immigration video sparks an Internet firestorm, Pittsburgh Post-Gazette, June 22, 2007
 "Lawmakers Request Investigation Into YouTube Video"  Sen. Chuck Grassley and Rep. Lamar Smith ask the Labor Department to look into a video they say documents H-1B abuse by companies. Information Week, June 21, 2007
 Oct. 2007 study by The Urban Institute  – ''Into the Eye of the Storm: Assessing the Evidence on Science and Engineering Education, Quality, and Workforce Demand' B. Lindsay Lowell and Hal Salzman'
 Guestworkers in the High-Skill U.S. Labor Market: An Analysis of Supply, Employment, and Wage Trends "(2013) Hal Salzman, Daniel Kuehn, B. Lindsay Lowell Economic Policy Institute"

External links
 U.S. Department of State information on H-1B visa
 U.S. GAO Report on H-1B Problems, PDF format 
 H-1B Quota Updates from USCIS

United States visas by type
Employment of foreign-born
1990 introductions